Acanthoderes laevicollis is a species of beetle in the family Cerambycidae. It was described by Bates in 1872 CE. They are native to Central America, as well as Nicagura.

References

Acanthoderes
Beetles described in 1872